Mount Etherington is located on the border of Alberta and British Columbia on the Continental Divide. It was named in 1918 after Etherington, Colonel Frederick C.M.G.

See also
List of peaks on the British Columbia–Alberta border

References

Two-thousanders of Alberta
Two-thousanders of British Columbia
Canadian Rockies